The Hixson–Skinner Mill Complex, also known as Cole's Grist Mill Complex, encompasses a historic grist mill and two houses located where Still Valley Road crosses the Pohatcong Creek, about one half mile east of Springtown, in Pohatcong Township, Warren County, New Jersey. It was added to the National Register of Historic Places on December 2, 1982 for its significance in commerce and industry. It includes 4 contributing buildings and 2 contributing structures.

See also
 Hixson–Mixsell House

References

External links
 

		

Pohatcong Township, New Jersey
Buildings and structures in Warren County, New Jersey
National Register of Historic Places in Warren County, New Jersey
Grinding mills on the National Register of Historic Places in New Jersey
New Jersey Register of Historic Places